Brianna Westrup (born 22 February 1997) is a footballer who plays as a defender for Sunderland in the FA Women's Championship and the Scotland national team.

Club career
Westrup was born in California and received a scholarship to play soccer for the University of Virginia. She first moved to Europe to play for Danish club B.93 in 2019. After a spell with English club Newcastle United, she joined Scottish club Rangers in 2020. Westrup won the club's player of the year award in her first season there.

International career
Westrup was eligible to play for Scotland because her mother was born there. She was first selected for the Scotland squad in June 2021, and she made her international debut that month in a 1–0 win against Northern Ireland.

Honours

Club
Rangers
 Scottish Women's Premier League: 2021-22

References

External links
 

1997 births
Living people
Sportspeople from Newport Beach, California
American women's soccer players
American people of Scottish descent
Scottish women's footballers
Scotland women's international footballers
Newcastle United W.F.C. players
Rangers W.F.C. players
Scottish Women's Premier League players
Virginia Cavaliers women's soccer players
Women's association football defenders
Sunderland A.F.C. Ladies players